Jeffrey Lesser (born in New York City) is a music producer for Nickelodeon. He has received ten Emmy Award nominations for his work on Wonder Pets!, winning four of them.

Lesser was a music director and producer at Little Airplane Productions for thirteen years. He has produced records for Barbra Streisand (Lazy Afternoon) and Loudon Wainwright III (History), among others.

Biography
Jeffrey Lesser was born on the Upper West Side of New York City, where he also began his career. Lesser joined Little Airplane Productions in 2003 to work on later episodes of Oobi and soon became the company's musical director, composing all pieces for Little Airplane series 3rd & Bird, Small Potatoes, P. King Duckling, Wonder Pets! and others. He has also produced music for various theater productions, including The Rocky Horror Show, The Last Five Years, Tick, Tick... Boom! and Parade.

Awards
Lesser has been nominated for ten Creative Arts Daytime Emmy Awards, all for his work on the Wonder Pets! series.

References

External links

Living people
Record producers from New York (state)
Daytime Emmy Award winners
People from the Upper West Side
Year of birth missing (living people)
Jewish American musicians